Kristin Fraser (born February 29, 1980) is an American former competitive ice dancer who competed for Azerbaijan with Igor Lukanin. They teamed up in 2000 and became four-time Azerbaijani national champions. They represented Azerbaijan at the 2002 Winter Olympics and 2006 Winter Olympics. Fraser and Lukanin were married on December 31, 2010 in Montclair, New Jersey.

Fraser previously competed for the United States. She skated with Peter Kongkasem for four years until 1996 when he took a break from skating due to health issues and Jonathan Nichols.

Competitive highlights

For the United States

With Kongkasem

With Nichols

With Lukanin for Azerbaijan

Programs 
(with Lukanin)

References

External links

 Official site
 
 

1980 births
Figure skaters at the 2006 Winter Olympics
Figure skaters at the 2002 Winter Olympics
Living people
People from the San Francisco Bay Area
Azerbaijani female ice dancers
Olympic figure skaters of Azerbaijan
Azerbaijani people of American descent
American emigrants to Azerbaijan
American female ice dancers